Herbert Baumann (born 16 September 1964) is a retired Swiss football defender.

References

1964 births
Living people
Swiss men's footballers
FC Luzern players
Switzerland international footballers
Association football defenders